is a district located in Gifu Prefecture, Japan.

, the district has an estimated population of 46,685. The total area is 18.26 km2.

Towns
Ginan
Kasamatsu

Mergers
On November 1, 2004 - the town of Kawashima was merged into the expanded city of Kakamigahara.
On January 1, 2006 - the town of Yanaizu was merged into the expanded capital city of Gifu Prefecture, Gifu.

Notes

Districts in Gifu Prefecture